Eufriesea is a genus of euglossine bees. Like all orchid bees, they are restricted to the Neotropics.

All species range from entirely to at least partially metallic (the face and/or tegulae), though much of the body in some species may be brown/black in color and hairy.

Distribution
Eufriesea is the most widely distributed genus of euglossines. Specimens have been found from Texas to central Argentina.

E. purpurata
At least one species in this genus, Eufriesea purpurata from Brazil, has been shown to deliberately collect large quantities of the insecticide DDT without any apparent adverse effects. Individual bees were observed to collect as much as 2 mg, which is equivalent to several percent of the bee's weight. Bees were observed to return to the walls of houses that had been recently sprayed with DDT and to collect the dried insecticide. The males of orchid bees are known to collect aromatic fragrances from certain kinds of orchids, and it is thought that they use these in territorial display and courtship, probably as precursors of their own pheromones. Some orchid bees have also been found to collect fragrances from rotten wood.

Name
The genus is named after entomologist Heinrich Friese.

Species

 E. aeniventris (Mocsáry, 1896)
 Eufriesea andina (Friese, 1925)
 E. anisochlora (Kimsey, 1977)
 E. atlantica Nemésio, 2008
 E. auriceps (Friese, 1899)
 E. auripes (Gribodo, 1882)
 E. bare González & Gaiani, 1989
 Eufriesea barthelli Gonzalez & Griswold 2017
 E. boharti (Kimsey, 1977)
 E. brasilianorum (Friese, 1899)
 Eufriesea buchwaldi (Friese, 1923)
 E. caerulescens (Lepeletier, 1841)
 E. chaconi González & Gaiani, 1989
 E. chalybaea (Friese, 1923)
 E. chrysopyga (Mocsáry, 1898)
 E. combinata (Mocsáry, 1897)
 E. concava (Friese, 1899)
 E. convexa (Friese, 1899)
 E. corusca (Kimsey, 1977)
 Eufriesea dentilabris (Mocsáry, 1897)
 E. distinguenda (Gribodo, 1882)
 E. dressleri (Kimsey, 1977)
 E. duckei (Friese, 1923)
 E. eburneocincta (Kimsey, 1977)
 E. elegans (Lepeletier, 1841)
 Eufriesea engeli Gonzalez & Griswold 2017
 E. excellens (Friese, 1925)
 E. fallax (Smith, 1854)
 E. flaviventris (Friese, 1899)
 E. formosa (Mocsáry, 1908)
 E. fragrocara (Kimsey, 1977)
 Eufriesea heideri Nemésio & Bembé, 2008
 Eufriesea insularis Ayala et al., 2022
 E. kimimari González & Gaiani, 1989
 E. laniventris (Ducke, 1902)
 E. limbata (Mocsáry, 1897)
 E. lucida (Kimsey, 1977)
 E. lucifera Kimsey, 1977
 E. macroglossa (Moure, 1965)
 E. magrettii (Friese, 1899)
 E. mariana (Mocsáry, 1896)
 E. mexicana (Mocsáry, 1897)
 E. micheneri (Ayala & Engel, 2008)
 E. mussitans (Fabricius, 1787)
 E. nigrescens (Friese, 1925)
 E. nigrohirta (Friese, 1899)
 Eufriesea oliveri Gonzalez & Griswold 2017
 E. opulenta (Mocsáry, 1908)
 E. ornata (Mocsáry, 1896)
 E. pallida (Kimsey, 1977)
 E. pretiosa (Friese, 1903)
 E. pulchra (Smith, 1854)
 E. purpurata (Mocsáry, 1896)
 Eufriesea pyrrhopyga Faria & Melo 2011
 E. rufocauda (Kimsey, 1977)
 E. rugosa (Friese, 1899)
 E. schmidtiana (Friese, 1925)
 E. simillima (Moure & Michener, 1965)
 E. superba (Hoffmannsegg, 1817)
 E. surinamensis (Linnaeus, 1758)
 E. theresiae (Mocsáry, 1908)
 E. velutina (Moure, 1999)
 E. venezolana (Schrottky, 1913)
 E. venusta (Moure, 1965)
 E. vidua (Moure, 1976)
 E. violacea (Blanchard, 1840)
 E. violascens (Mocsáry, 1898)
 E. zhangi Nemésio, Júnior and Santos, 2013

References

Further reading
  (1993): Nonfloral sources of chemicals that attract male euglossine bees (Apidae: Euglossini). Journal of Chemical Ecology 19(12): 1573–1561. 
  (2004): Phylogeny and Biology of Neotropical Orchid Bees (Euglossini). Annual Review of Entomology 49: 377–404. 
  (1989): Ecology and natural history of tropical bees. New York: Cambridge Univ. Press. 
  (2007): Revisiting the organohalogens associated with 1979-samples of Brazilian bees (Eufriesea purpurata). Science of the Total Environment 377: 371–377.

External links
 David Roubik (Smithsonian Tropical Research Institute): Diagnostic photographs of several Eufriesea species:
E. mussitans · E. ornata · E. pulchra · E. purpurata · E. surinamensis

 
Euglossini
Taxa named by Theodore Dru Alison Cockerell
Bee genera
Orchid pollinators